UTF-1 is a method of transforming ISO/IEC 10646/Unicode into a stream of bytes. Its design does not provide self-synchronization, which makes searching for substrings and error recovery difficult. It reuses the ASCII printing characters for multi-byte encodings, making it unsuited for some uses (for instance Unix filenames cannot contain the byte value used for forward slash). UTF-1 is also slow to encode or decode due to its use of division and multiplication by a number which is not a power of 2. Due to these issues, it did not gain acceptance and was quickly replaced by UTF-8.

Design 
Similar to UTF-8, UTF-1 is a variable-width encoding that is backwards-compatible with ASCII. Every Unicode code point is represented by either a single byte, or a sequence of two, three, or five bytes. All ASCII code points are a single byte (the code points  through  are also single bytes).

UTF-1 does not use the C0 and C1 control codes or the space character in multi-byte encodings: a byte in the range 0–0x20 or 0x7F–0x9F always stands for the corresponding code point. This design with 66 protected characters tried to be ISO/IEC 2022 compatible.

UTF-1 uses "modulo 190" arithmetic (256 − 66 = 190). For comparison, UTF-8 protects all 128 ASCII characters and needs one bit for this, and a second bit to make it self-synchronizing, resulting in "modulo 64" arithmetic. BOCU-1 protects only the minimal set required for MIME-compatibility (0x00, 0x07–0x0F, 0x1A–0x1B, and 0x20), resulting in "modulo 243" arithmetic (256 − 13 = 243).

Although modern Unicode ends at U+10FFFF, both UTF-1 and UTF-8 were designed to encode the complete 31 bits of the original Universal Character Set (UCS-4), and the last entry in this table shows this original final code point.

See also 
 Comparison of Unicode encodings
 Universal Character Set

References 
 
 
 
 

Unicode Transformation Formats